Čukovec may refer to:

 Čukovec, Varaždin County, a village near Ludbreg, Croatia
 Čukovec, Međimurje County, a village near Prelog, Croatia